Gunga Mwinga (died 27 December 2020) was a Kenyan politician who served as a MP for Kaloleni from 2013 to 2017. He also formed and led the Devolution Party of Kenya. On 27 December 2020, he died at Mombasa Hospital, aged 45.

References

Year of birth missing
Date of birth missing
2020 deaths
Kenyan politicians